"Ímpetu" is a flamenco guitar composition, a bulerias. It was composed by Mario Escudero. It was recorded by Paco de Lucía on his 1967 album La fabulosa guitarra de Paco de Lucía.

References

External links
Paco de Lucia video

Flamenco compositions
Paco de Lucía songs
1967 songs